Paco Lala's (born Francisco René Anaya on July 22, 1973 in Ciudad Juárez, Mexico) is a Mexican TV host who is remembered because of his participation on the famous Mexican TV show "Cada Mañana" from 2000 to 2005.

References 

1973 births
Living people
Mexican television personalities
People from Ciudad Juárez